Paipai is the native language of the Paipai, spoken in the Baja California municipality of Ensenada (settlements of Arroyo de León (Ejido Kiliwas), Camalu, Cañón de la Parra, Comunidad Indígena de Santa Catarina, Ejido 18 de Marzo (El Álamo), El Aguajito (El Mat Chip), El Alamar, El Pinacate [Chknan], El Ranchito [Wikwalpuk], El Sauzal, Ensenada, Ex Hacienda Sinaloa, Héroes de la Independencia (Llano Colorado), Lázaro Cárdenas (Valle de Trinidad), La Huerta, La Vinata [Wipuk], Leyes de Reforma (El Rodeo), Misión Santo Domingo, Ojo de Agua Colorada, Poblado Héroes de Chapultepec, Poblado Puerta Trampa, Pórticos del Mar, Ranchito Xonuko, Rancho Agua de Vida, Rancho el Sauco, Rancho Escondido, Rancho las Canoas, Rancho Mariscal, Rancho San Belem, Rancho Santa Martha, Real del Castillo Nuevo (Ojos Negros), Rincón de Santa Catarina, San Isidoro, Sauce Largo [Yokakgul], Sauce Solo [Yokazis], Úrsulo Galván, Valle de la Trinidad, and Yokakiul). It is part of the Yuman language family. There are quite a few speakers left, but most are over age 50. Most Paipai now live in Kumeyaay villages.

It is believed that Paipai was separated from the Northern Pai languages many years ago. In oral tradition of most Yuman tribes, the people descended from Avikwame (also known as Newberry Mt.) and went were Kumat directed them. So at one time the Paipai might have been with the other tribes.

The Paipai language was documented by Judith Joël and  Mauricio J. Mixco, who have published texts and studies of syntax.

Paipai belongs to the Yuman language family. Within the Yuman family, Paipai belongs to the Pai branch, which also includes the Upland Yuman language, dialects of which are spoken by the Yavapai, Walapai, and Havasupai of western Arizona. The relationship between Paipai and Upland Yuman is very close; some observers have suggested that Paipai and Yavapai are mutually intelligible (i.e., that the Paipai and Upland Yumans spoke dialects of a single language), while other observers have claimed that they are not.

The controversial technique of glottochronology suggests that the Pai branch of Yuman may have separated from the other two branches of Core Yuman (River Yuman and Delta–California Yuman) about 1,000-1,700 years ago. Paipai may have separated from Upland Yuman 1,000 years ago or less.

Phonology

Consonants

 /x/ can be heard as uvular [χ] when preceding consonants, or in syllable initial position.
 /ʐ/ can be heard as an alveolar trill [r] in free variation among speakers.

Vowels

 /a/ can be heard as [ə] in syllable initial position.

References

Yuman–Cochimí languages
Indigenous languages of the Southwestern United States
Indigenous languages of the North American Southwest